The 2018 Copa do Brasil third stage was the third stage of the 2018 Copa do Brasil football competition. It was played from 28 February to 15 March 2018. A total of 20 teams competed in the third stage to decide ten places in the fourth stage of the 2018 Copa do Brasil.

Format
In the third stage, each tie was played on a home-and-away two-legged basis. If tied on aggregate, the away goals rule would not be used, extra time would not be played and the penalty shoot-out would be used to determine the winner. Host teams were settled in a draw held on 21 February 2018, 11:00 at CBF headquarters in Rio de Janeiro.

Matches
All times are Brasília time, BRT (UTC−3)

|}

Match 61

Tied 1–1 on aggregate, Atlético Paranaense won on penalties and advanced to the fourth round.

Match 62

Internacional won 4–0 on aggregate and advanced to the fourth round.

Match 63

Avaí won 3–1 on aggregate and advanced to the fourth round.

Match 64

Goiás won 2–1 on aggregate and advanced to the fourth round.

Match 65

Tied 0–0 on aggregate, Ponte Preta won on penalties and advanced to the fourth round.

Match 66

São Paulo won 5–0 on aggregate and advanced to the fourth round.

Match 67

Vitória won 3–1 on aggregate and advanced to the fourth round.

Match 68

Tied 2–2 on aggregate, Atlético Mineiro won on penalties and advanced to the fourth round.

Match 69

Ferroviário won 2–1 on aggregate and advanced to the fourth round.

Match 70

Náutico won 3–1 on aggregate and advanced to the fourth round.

References

2018 Copa do Brasil